Pedicularis hirsuta, commonly known as Hairy Lousewort, is a species of flowering plant belonging to the family Orobanchaceae.

Its native range is Subarctic.

References

hirsuta